This list contains the 40 seats and their respective patrons, founders and members of Academia Brasileira de Letras.

References

Brazilian Academy of Letters
Brazilian Academy of Letters